The Agent-General for New South Wales is the representative of the State of New South Wales in the United Kingdom. The position is appointed by and the expenses and salaries paid by the state government to represent their commercial, legal, and diplomatic interests in Britain and to the British government and Whitehall.

The first agent-general was appointed in 1864 as a representative of the then-colonial government, and apart from a short period between 1932 and 1934, the position was held continuously until 1993 after which it was abolished. The position was revived in 2021, and is currently held by former Investment NSW CEO Stephen Cartwright, as both Agent General to the UK, and the state's Senior Trade and Investment Commissioner to Europe and Israel.

History

The [[New South Wales]] Office in London was one of several overseas offices established by the colonies of Australia to represent their interests. The London Office was established after the appointment of the first Agent-General on 1 May 1864. In June 1932, the Agent-General's Office was abolished as a cost-cutting measure and was replaced by the New South Wales Government Offices, London, to be headed by an "Official Representative". The title was renamed Agent-General in 1937, but was left vacant from 1939 to 1946 due to the Second World War. From 1972 to 1993, the Agent-General's Office was located in separate premises from Australia House, at the nearby address of 66 The Strand, which was opened by Queen Elizabeth II in May 1972.

In October 1992, the position of NSW Agent-General in London was abolished by the Fahey government. This occurred following an expenses scandal by the last Agent-General, Neil Pickard, who had been appointed as a consolation for losing his seat in parliament. Following its abolition, Fahey noted to Parliament: "It was abundantly clear to me, to all Cabinet and to all Government that we no longer needed an agent-general's office in London. That was a throwback to colonial days - to the days when it was important to have garden parties and to participate in ceremonies. Quite frankly, little or no benefit accrued to New South Wales by participating in such a process." The Agent-General's Office was replaced by the NSW Government Trade and Investment Office, London, which had no ceremonial function, but focused on the promotion of investment and trade in the UK and Europe. The NSW Government of Gladys Berejiklian considered reviving the Agent-General position in late-2019, noting that "We know the post-Brexit environment is going to be very different and NSW can gain a lot of opportunities in business from the UK".

The position was revived in 2021, with an expanded remit to additionally cover Europe and Israel.

List of Agents-General

References

Agents-General for New South Wales
Australian diplomats
Lists of office-holders in Australia
Diplomats by role
British colonial officials